Strange Desire is the debut studio album released by American indie pop act Bleachers, led by guitarist Jack Antonoff. The album was released on July 11, 2014, through RCA Records, and produced the singles "I Wanna Get Better", "Shadow" and "Rollercoaster".

Release
"I Wanna Get Better" was released digitally as the lead single from Strange Desire on February 18, 2014. It has peaked at number one on the Billboard Alternative Songs chart and number ten on the Hot Rock Songs chart, becoming Bleachers' most successful single to date. The song's music video – directed by actress and filmmaker Lena Dunham, Antonoff's then girlfriend – premiered on March 27, and depicts Antonoff as a troubled therapist. "Shadow" was made available for streaming on April 29, before being released as the album's second single on May 6. On May 15, Strange Desire was announced for release in July. Antonoff said the name was "the 2 words that perfectly title what this Bleachers album is as a documentation of my life as I can remember it at this point". "Rollercoaster" was released as the third single on June 10 and was also made available upon pre-ordering Strange Desire on the iTunes Store. "Like a River Runs" was made available for streaming on June 27. Strange Desire was released on July 15 through RCA Records, and was made available for streaming the following day.

Following the release, the group performed at a number of festivals: Wireless, Osheaga, Lollapalooza, Outside Lands Music, Boston Calling Music and ACL Music. "Rollercoaster" was released to radio on September 9. In late November, the group released 
Strange Desire (The Demos) for Record Store Day Black Friday, consisting of six album demos. In March and April 2015, the group embarked on a headlining US tour, dubbed Bleachers Come Alive!, with support from Joywave and Night Terrors of 1927. Following this, the band appeared at Rock in Rio festival in May. In June and July, the group went on a mixture of US, European and Canadian shows. In July and August, the group went on a co-headlining US tour with Charli XCX, titled Charli and Jack Do America Tour. On August 12, a music video was released for "Like a River Runs". The group was scheduled to go on a second leg of their tour with Charli XCX in September and October. However, on August 22 it was announced that the leg had been cancelled amid creative and personal differences.

Track listing 
Strange Desire (Japanese Edition)

Notes
 signifies an additional producer.

Personnel 
Jack Antonoff – programming, drums, bass, guitars, keyboards, piano, vocals, string arrangement ("I'm Ready to Move On/Wild Heart Reprise")
Cyrus Grace Dunham – spoken word ("Wild Heart," "I'm Ready to Move On/Wild Heart Reprise," "Who I Want You to Love")
John Hill – programming, drums, guitars, keyboards
Vince Clarke – programming, keyboards
Greg Kurstin – synths, electric guitars, drums
Sara Quin – background vocals
Jon Shiffman – drums
Emile Haynie – programming
Rachel Antonoff – background vocals
Andrew Dost – background vocals
Mae Whitman – background vocals
Grimes – vocals
Kurt Uenala – programming
Lena Dunham – background vocals
Yoko Ono – spoken word ("I'm Ready to Move On/Wild Heart Reprise")
Little Ricky Antonoff – guitar
Phillip Peterson – cello, string arrangement ("Who I Want You to Love")
Victoria Parker – violin

Charts 
Strange Desire debuted at No. 11 on the US Billboard 200 chart, selling 21,000 copies in its first week of release.

Release history

Terrible Thrills, Vol. 2 

Terrible Thrills, Vol. 2 is the first compilation album by American indie pop act Bleachers, released on September 25, 2015, as a companion to Strange Desire. The album features every song from Bleachers' debut album covered by female artists, most of which signed with RCA Records. Its title references Terrible Thrills, Vol. 1, a compilation album released in 2010 by Antonoff's previous band Steel Train.

References 

2014 debut albums
Bleachers (band) albums
Albums produced by John Hill (record producer)
RCA Records albums
Albums produced by Vince Clarke
Albums produced by Jack Antonoff
Albums produced by Greg Kurstin